The American occupation zone (German: Amerikanische Besatzungszone, US-Zone, or Southwest zone) was one of the four occupation zones established by the Allies of World War II in Germany west of the Oder–Neisse line in July 1945, around two months after the German surrender and the end of World War II in Europe. It was controlled by the Office of Military Government, United States (OMGUS) and ceased to exist after the establishment of the Federal Republic of Germany on 21 September 1949 (FRG established 23 May 1949), but United States maintains military presence across Germany.

Geography

The American zone encompassed a large section of south-eastern and central Germany: 
 Bavaria (including the Thuringian exclave of Ostheim, but excluding Lindau and the Palatinate)
 The Prussian provinces of Kurhessen and Nassau (excluding the various exclaves belonging to them and the districts of Oberwesterwald, Unterwesterwald, Unterlahn, and Sankt Goarshausen) 
 The portions of the People's State of Hesse east of the Rhine river (Starkenburg, Upper Hesse, and the parts of Rhenish Hesse east of the river).
 The portions of Württemberg and the Republic of Baden north of the Karlsruhe-Ulm Reichsautobahn (now the A 8) 

In addition, Bremen and Bremerhaven (including the districts of Wesermünde, Osterholz und Wesermarsch until December 1945) were part of the zone  and played a central role as the port through which the occupation zone was supplied. 

At the end of October 1946, the American Zone had a population of:
 Bavaria 8.7 million
 Hesse 3.97 million
 Württemberg-Baden 3.6 million
 Bremen 0.48 million

Berlin was divided in four between the four occupying powers. The southwestern portion (Zehlendorf, Steglitz, Schöneberg, Kreuzberg, Tempelhof, Neukölln) was the American sector and came under US military administration, but was formally separate from the American occupation zone. 

Under the Wanfried agreement on 17 September 1945, some villages on the Werra river were exchanged for some villages in the Soviet Occupation Zone, in order to place the whole of the  under American control. This also brought part of Eichsfeld into the zone.

Military government

The headquarters of the OMGUS was the former IG Farben Building in Frankfurt am Main. Command of the OMGUS was initially invested in the later President Dwight Eisenhower, who was commander-in-chief of the American forces in Europe at the end of World War II. 

Eisenhower's successors were:
 George S. Patton (November 1945, acting)
 Joseph T. McNarney (November 1945–January 1947)
 Lucius D. Clay (January 1947–May 1949)
 Clarence R. Huebner (May–September 1949, acting)

The four Allied powers coordinated the occupation of Germany through the Allied Control Council, which ceased to operated after the Soviets withdrew from it on 20 March 1948. In 1949, the military administration of the American, British, and French zones was succeeded by the Allied High Commission, which remained in operation until 1955.

The military occupation of the American sector of West Berlin continued until 2 October 1990.

Political organisation 
Under "Proclamation no. 2" of 19 September 1945, they announced the intention to organise the territory on a federal model. Württemberg-Baden subsequently merged with the states of Baden and Württemberg-Hohenzollern in the French occupation zone to form Baden-Württemberg in 1952.

On 5 March 1946, the Law for Liberation from National Socialism and Militarism (German: Befreiungsgesetz) came into force in the American zone, providing the model for Denazification throughout the western zones: all Germans over 18 years of age must complete a questionnaire giving an account of their role in Nazi Germany.

On 1 January 1947, the American and British occupation zones were combined to form the Bizone. This became the Trizone after the French occupation zone joined on 1 August 1948 and became the Federal Republic of Germany ("West Germany") on 23 May 1949 with the passage of the Basic Law.

Media
Following the complete closure of all Nazi German media, the launch and operation of completely new newspaper titles began by licensing carefully selected Germans as publishers. Licenses were granted to Germans not involved in Nazi propaganda to establish those newspapers, including Frankfurter Rundschau (August 1945), Der Tagesspiegel (Berlin; September 1945), and Süddeutsche Zeitung (Munich; October 1945). 

Radio stations were run by the military government. Unlike the French and British zones, which each established a single channel ( and NWDR respectively), the Americans established several broadcasters, in line with the system of local radio broadcasters in the United States: Bayerischer Rundfunk (BR, initially Radio München), Radio Bremen, Hessischer Rundfunk (HR, initially Radio Frankfurt), and Süddeutscher Rundfunk (SDR, initially Radio Stuttgart). The RIAS in West-Berlin remained a radio station under U.S. control.

Transport 
From 22 September 1945, there were three long-distance train services operating in the American occupation zone, for the first time since the end of the war. All three routes travelled from Frankfurt am Main and were third class only:
 D 57 / D 58 Frankfurt (Main) Ost through Nuremberg Central to Munich Central (ca. 11 hours)
 D 369 / D 370 Frankfurt (Main) Süd through Kornwestheim to Munich Central (ca. 10.5 hours)
 D 115 / D 116 Frankfurt (Main) Ost–Hof Central (ca. 10 hours)

Archives 
The original documents of the OMGUS are kept in the Washington National Records Center (held by the University of Maryland). The documents from Hesse were recorded on microfiche in the late 1970s/early 1980s, which are now accessible in all three Hessian State Archives (Hessian Central State Archives in Wiesbaden, Hessian State Archives in Marburg und ). The Hessian State Archives in Darmstadt have made the details of all these microfiches available online.

References

Bibliography 
 John Gimbel: Amerikanische Besatzungspolitik in Deutschland 1945–1949. S. Fischer Verlag, Frankfurt am Main 1971, ISBN 3-10-026101-1.
 Klaus-Dietmar Henke: Die amerikanische Besetzung Deutschlands. 3rd edition. Oldenbourg, München 2009, ISBN 978-3-486-59079-1.
 Ralph Willett: The Americanization of Germany, 1945–1949. (Revised edition). Routledge, London 1992, .
 Earl F. Ziemke: The U.S. Army in the Occupation of Germany, 1944–1946. Center of Military History, United States Army, Washington D.C. 1990 (history.army.mil).

External links

 

1945 establishments in Germany
1949 disestablishments in West Germany
 
American military occupations
States and territories established in 1945
Germany